The 1981 CRC Chemicals 300 was a Touring Car race staged at Amaroo Park Raceway in New South Wales, Australia on 9 August 1981.
The race, which was organised by the Australian Racing Drivers Club, was contested over 155 laps, a total distance of 299.1 km.
It was a non-championship event which did not count towards either the 1981 Australian Touring Car Championship or the 1981 Australian Endurance Championship.

The race was won by  Peter Brock and John Harvey driving a Holden Commodore VC entered by the Marlboro Holden Dealer Team.

Class structure
Cars competed in three classes:
 Four & five cylinders
 Six cylinders & Rotary
 Eight cylinders & over

Results

Notes
 Entries: 37
 Pole Position: Dick Johnson, 54.0s
 Starters: 25
 Finishers: 14
 Race time of winning car:  2h 31m 16.8s
 Winning margin: 5.8s
 Four & five cylinders class winners: David Seldon & Phil Ward (Isuzu Gemini ZZ)
 Six cylinders & Rotary class winners: Allan Grice (BMW 635 CSi)

References

CRC Chemicals 300
1981 CRC Chemicals 300